The Saltee Islands (Irish: Oileán an tSalainn; Old Norse: Salt ey ) are a pair of small islands lying 5 kilometres off the southern coast of County Wexford in Ireland. The two islands are Great Saltee (89 hectares) and Little Saltee (37 hectares). They have been largely unoccupied since the early 20th century and have been privately owned by the Neale family since 1943. Together the islands cover an area of 1.2 square kilometers.

Protected status

The islands are a breeding ground for fulmar, gannet, shag, kittiwake, guillemot, razorbill, puffin and grey seal. The islands are also at the center of a related Special Area of Conservation named after them, extending to the mainland coastline east of Kilmore Quay. The conservation area specifically addresses: the mud and sand flats on the mainland coastline as well as those surrounding the mainland facing sides of Little Saltee; large shallow inlets and bays to the west of an imaginary line joining Kilmore Quay and Great Saltee; reefs throughout the entire area; the vegetated sea cliffs which surround both islands; sea caves along the south coast of Great Saltee and the entire area as a grey seal habitat with specific reference to both islands as important sites, including for breeding, along with some areas further out also of interest as moult and resting haul-out sites.

Geology and geography
The islands are based on Pre-Cambrian bedrock between 600 million and 2 billion years old. The highest point in the Saltees is South Summit on Great Saltee at 198 feet (60 metres). The waters around the islands can be treacherous, hence the area is known as the "Graveyard of a Thousand Ships and the islands their tombstones".

Demographics

Popular culture

 The Saltee Islands are the setting for Eoin Colfer's book Airman as a powerful sovereign state based around diamond industry. However, the book is a work of fiction and no significant natural resources have been found.

Further reading
 Deane, C.D. 1974. On the wild island kingdom of Great Saltee. Belfast News Letter. 7 December.
 Moran, J. 1980. Kings of the Great Saltee The Countryman Winter 1979/80, Vol 84, p85-91

References

External links

 Official website of the Saltee Islands

Islands of County Wexford
Private islands of Ireland